"The Stolen Child" is an 1889 poem by William Butler Yeats, published  in The Wanderings of Oisin and Other Poems.

Overview

The poem was written in 1886 and is considered to be one of Yeats's more notable early poems. The poem is based on Irish legend and concerns faeries beguiling a child to come away with them. Yeats had a great interest in Irish mythology about faeries resulting in his publication of Fairy and Folk Tales of the Irish Peasantry in 1888 and Fairy Folk Tales of Ireland in 1892.

The poem reflects the early influence of Romantic literature and Pre-Raphaelite verse.

Publication history
The poem was first published in the Irish Monthly in December 1886.  The poem was then published in a compilation of work by several Irish poets Poems and Ballads of Young Ireland in 1888 with several critics praising the poem. It was later published in his first book of poetry The Wanderings of Oisin and Other Poems as well as Fairy and Folk Tales of the Irish Peasantry.

Musical adaptations
The poem was first set to music as his Op.38 by the English composer Cyril Rootham, originally for SATB voices and piano (1911) and then for SATB chorus and small orchestra (1912). The poem was also set to music and recorded by Loreena McKennitt on her 1985 debut album Elemental and again on Nights from the Alhambra (2006). Subsequently, additional musical versions were recorded by the folk rock group The Waterboys, appearing on their 1988 album Fisherman's Blues, with portions of the poem spoken by Tomas Mac Eoin; Heather Alexander on her 1994 album Wanderlust; and Hamilton Camp on his 2005 album Sweet Joy in the song "Celts". Another version, set to music and recorded on the Danny Ellis album 800 Voices, was released in 2006. The poem was also set to music and recorded by Kate Price on her 1993 album The Time Between.

In 2012, Merrymouth, a folk band led by Simon Fowler of Ocean Colour Scene recorded the poem set to a melody written by Fowler and music by Merrymouth (Fowler, Sealey, McNamara) for their debut album Simon Fowler's Merrymouth.  The American composer Eric Whitacre has also set this poem in a piece for The King's Singers and the National Youth Choir of Great Britain. British composer and guitar virtuoso Steve Hackett recorded a version of Yeats' poem under the title "Waters of the Wild" on his 2006 album Wild Orchids.

The poem has also been set to music by Norwegian composer Marcus Paus, and was included on the Grammy-nominated album Kind (2010) by Ensemble 96; Stephen Eddins wrote that Paus's work is "sumptuously lyrical and magically wild, and [...] beautifully captures the alluring mystery and danger and melancholy" of Yeats. Kirk McElhearn wrote that "it presents a sound-world that is astounding and moving."

In modern culture

This poem was written on the wall of the Wohnheim (employees' hostel) of Odenwald-Konserven in 1989, presumably by one of the Irish students working there.

Keith Donohue's novel The Stolen Child (Nan A. Talese, 2006) was inspired by the poem. The refrain is prominently featured in Steven Spielberg's film A.I. Artificial Intelligence. The poem is also featured in the television series Torchwood episode "Small Worlds", being spoken by a fairy who steals a young girl. The novel Dies the Fire also incorporates the poem into elements of Wiccan rituals.

An Irish dance show called The Prophecy is based upon the poem. It is performed by Scottish-based company Siamsoir Irish Dancers and has won an award for the Best Dance and Theatre act at the world's largest Robert Burns festival, The Big Burns Supper in Dumfries.

The refrain is featured in the 2014 movie Song of the Sea, which is based largely on Celtic mythology. The novella "The World More Full of Weeping" by Robert Wiersema references this poem. The novel "Shutter Man" by Richard Montanari references the last stanza of the poem. The poem is referenced in the novel "The Lost Book of the White" by Cassandra Clare. In chapter 10. On the television show The Finder, the line "Come away, O human child" is seen inscribed on Eloise Jade Knox's headstone in episode 10, The Conversation. American hard rock band The Sword, in the liner notes from their debut album Age of Winters, quotes the refrain of the poem, among artwork of trees and faeries. In the 2020 movie Comes Away directed by Brenda Chapman, it is used in both prologue and epilogue of the movie.

See also
 1889 in poetry
 List of works by William Butler Yeats

References

Literature
 R. F. Foster, W. B. Yeats: a Life, Oxford University Press 1998  pages 56, 75-76
 Richard J Finneran (ed) Yeats: An Annual of Critical and Textual Studies XII, 1994  pages 91–92
 Michael Bell, Literature, Modernism and Myth: Belief and Responsibility in the Twentieth Centuries  pages 44–59
 David Ben-Merre, Falling into Silence: Giorgio Agamben at the End of the PoemMOSAIC 2012   pages 89–104
 Terence Brown, The Life of W.B. Yeats Blackwell Publishing 2001  pages 9, 19, 66
 William A. Dumbletone, Ireland: Life and Land in Literature SUNY Press 1994  Pages 93–95, 129, 135-138

External links

 Top 100 Irish Poems: The Stolen Child, By W. B. Yeats

1886 poems
Poetry by W. B. Yeats
The Waterboys songs